Peter Neil Melesso (born 30 November 1961) is a former Australian rules footballer who played with South Melbourne, St Kilda and the West Coast Eagles in the Victorian/Australian Football League (VFL/AFL).

A South Districts recruit, Melesso managed just one senior appearance for South Melbourne, which came in the final home and away round of the 1981 VFL season. He played seven games in three seasons with St Kilda then ended up with Claremont in the WAFL, where he became a mainstay of a champion team under Gerard Neesham and three times produced memorable kicks to save the Tigers from defeat. The West Coast Eagles gave him another chance at VFL level when they selected him with the 108th pick of the 1988 VFL Draft.

Melesso, a key position player, was diagnosed with lymphatic cancer during the 1990 season and didn't play for the club again.

In 2005, Melesso was called up as a witness in the manslaughter trial of Melbourne bouncer Zdravko Micevic. Melesso had been working in the bottle shop of the Beaconsfield Hotel in St Kilda where Micevic was accused of an assault which resulted in the death of cricketer David Hookes.

Notes
He kicked behinds after the siren to draw with Subiaco in 1987 and with Swan Districts in 1988 plus a goal after the siren to beat South Fremantle in 1987.

References

1961 births
Sydney Swans players
St Kilda Football Club players
West Coast Eagles players
Claremont Football Club players
Living people
Australian rules footballers from Victoria (Australia)